Qaz al-Khass (also spelled Qazl Khass or Kazz el-Khass; also known as al-Rabyah) is a village in northern Syria located northwest of Homs in the Homs Governorate. According to the Syria Central Bureau of Statistics, Qaz al-Khass had a population of 543 in the 2004 census. Its inhabitants are predominantly Alawites.

References

Bibliography

 

Populated places in Talkalakh District
Alawite communities in Syria